Takhti-Tepha Natural Monument is a landform created by the eruption of mud, slurries, water and gases in proximity of Takhti-Tepha mountain range. This mud volcano is  located on plane, south of Dali water reservoir,  at 620 m above sea level in Dedoplistsqaro Municipality,  Georgia  and incorporated in Vashlovani Protected Areas. 
Mud craters, along with small open vents are constantly active, erupting mud, oil and gas. The length of the pedestrian path across the Takhti-Tepha  Natural Monument is 0.5 km. The total area of the natural monument is 9.7 ha.
The largest mud cater is 3,5-4 m in diameter.   The landscape is built of sandstones and clays.

See also 
Vashlovani National Park

References

Natural monuments of Georgia (country)
Kakheti
Mud volcanoes